Bangladesh Islami University is a private university located at Gopibag, in Dhaka, Bangladesh.

History
Bangladesh Islami University was opened in 2006 by prime minister Begum Khaleda Zia at the request of Syed Kamaluddin Zafree, a prominent Islamic scholar. Syed Kamaluddin Zafree later became a member of the governing body of the university.

References

 
2006 establishments in Bangladesh
Educational institutions established in 2006
Universities and colleges in Dhaka
Private universities in Bangladesh
Islam in Dhaka
Islamic universities and colleges in Bangladesh